Arthur "Archie" Stephens (born 19 May 1954) is a retired footballer. He played over 120 times for Bristol Rovers before moving north to Middlesbrough. He later went on to play for other local teams Carlisle United and Darlington before finishing his career at Guisborough Town.

He was appointed manager at Northallerton Town early in the 1997–98 season, but left at the end of the season after the club were relegated.

References

External links
http://borobanter.gazettelive.co.uk/cgi-bin/mt421/mt-search.cgi?IncludeBlogs=243&search=archie+stephens
http://borobanter.gazettelive.co.uk/2008/08/pears-steals-show-may-1995.html
http://www.ciderspace.co.uk/ASP/history/yeovil-town-story45.asp

1954 births
Living people
Footballers from Liverpool
English footballers
Association football forwards
Westbury United F.C. players
Melksham Town F.C. players
Bristol Rovers F.C. players
Middlesbrough F.C. players
Carlisle United F.C. players
Yeovil Town F.C. players
Darlington F.C. players
Guisborough Town F.C. players
English Football League players
National League (English football) players
English football managers
Northallerton Town F.C. managers